The 2008 Buffalo Bulls football team represented the University at Buffalo in the 2008 NCAA Division I FBS football season.  2008 was a season of firsts for the Bulls.  With a 40–34 double overtime win over Bowling Green on November 21, the Bulls won the MAC East division and gained a berth to the MAC Championship for the first time.  The Bulls won their first conference championship by beating #12 ranked and previously undefeated Ball State, 42–24 on December 5.  The win was also Buffalo's first against a ranked opponent and ensured a winning season for the first time since Buffalo returned to the top-level of college football in 1999.  They earned an invitation to the International Bowl at the Rogers Centre in Toronto, their first trip to a bowl game in their history, exactly fifty years after the Bulls turned down their only previous bowl bid, to the Tangerine Bowl, when they were told by the bowl's organizers that their two black players would not be allowed to play.  The Bulls also received their first votes in the USA Today Coaches' Poll after winning the MAC Championship when UTEP coach Mike Price voted the Bulls #23 on his ballot.  On December 16, Buffalo announced head coach Turner Gill agreed to a contract extension and a raise.  Gill's contract now runs through 2013 and makes him one of the highest-paid coaches in the MAC.  The ending of the season was bittersweet as the Bulls lost to the Connecticut Huskies 38-20 in the International Bowl, but the Bulls were able to give about two dozen members of the 1958 Bulls team the bowl experience they missed by inviting them to be honorary captains for the game.

Notable players
 Drew Willy, Quarterback
 Naaman Roosevelt, Wide receiver
 James Starks, Running back
 Ronald Hilaire, Defensive Lineman

Schedule

Rankings

References

Buffalo Bulls
Buffalo Bulls football seasons
Mid-American Conference football champion seasons
Buffalo Bulls football